Daryl Williams may refer to:

 Daryl Williams (politician) (born 1942), Australian politician
 Daryl Williams (American football) (born 1992), American football offensive tackle
 Daryl Williams (rugby union) (born 1964), New Zealand-born Samoan rugby union player

See also
 Darrel Williams (born 1995), American football running back
Darryl Williams (disambiguation)
Darrell Williams (disambiguation)